The 2013 World Games, the ninth World Games, were an international multi-sport event held in the city of Cali, Colombia, from July 25 to August 4.

Host city allocation history
The 2013 World Games were initially allocated to the German cities of Duisburg and Düsseldorf.  However, at the end of 2008, Duisburg withdrew and Düsseldorf dropped out because both cities could not secure enough funding, partly as a result of the financial crisis of 2007–08 and the subsequent Great Recession.

Two alternate cities came forward to the IWGA to bid for these Games: Pretoria, South Africa and Cali, Colombia. During The World Games 2009 in Kaohsiung, Chinese Taipei, the IWGA announced that Cali has won the right to host The World Games in 2013.

Sports

Official sports
The 2013 World Games programme featured 32 official sports, and 4 invitational sports. The numbers in parentheses indicate the number of medal events, which were contested in each sports discipline.

Invitational sports

Garden of Sport
The "Garden of Sport" events were held in the neighboring towns of Buga and Jamundí. These demonstration events served to showcase these disciplines for potential inclusion in future games.

Two of the competitions were held at Coliseo Mayor in Buga:
 Futsal (AMF rules)
 Kudo, men's and women's.

The other three disciplines took place in Jamundí:
 Coliseo Alfaguara y Plaza Mayor - Wallball and Frontball
 Estadio El Cacique - Hapkido

Calendar
2013 World Games Event Schedule
Note: Due to concerns about temperature and air flow at the Del Pueblo Gymnasium, where the sport of Rhythmic Gymnastics was taking place, the Ribbons event was cancelled at the last moment.
Key:
 Invitational sport

Participant countries

 2013 World Games participant countries (with number of athletes): 

  (1)
  (2)
  (65)
  (15)
 
  (44)
 
  (15)
  (59)
  (1)
  (4)
  (74)
  (6)
  (90)
  (42)
  (105)
  Host
  (8)
  (18)
  (19)
  (71)
  (16)
  (7)
 
  (17)
 
  (7)
  (1)
  (10)
 
 
 
  (4)
  (1)
  (13)
  (53)
 
  (8)
  (17)
  (26)
  (11)
 
  (1)
 
  (1)
  (2)
  (45)
  (1)
  (35)
  (8)
  (2)
  (1)
  (1)
 
  (3)
  (1)
  (37)
  (2)
  (3)
  (18)
  (3)
 
  (1)
  (78)
  (24)
  (2)
  (28)
  (1)
 
 
  (33)
  (36)
  (3)
  (10)
  (12)
 
  (1)
 
  (2)
  (17)
  (10)
  (41)
  (37)
  (52)
  (77)
  (1)
  (51)
  (11)
  (6)
  (10)
 
  (90)
  (2)
  (102)
 
  (24)

Medal mistake
This particular edition made the mistake of putting the words "word games" instead of "world games," on one thousand medals. This fact was reported by Colombian news organization Noticias Uno. Several athletes smiled and were surprised upon seeing the typo. According to the representative of the firm that engraved the medals, several authorities had seen and approved the medals' design without noticing the mistake, including Coldeportes director Andrés Botero, and the head of the Organizing Committee Rodrigo Otoya. The representative also stated that, according to a corporate policy, "... any mistake after the art has been approved (by the client) will not be responsibility of the Firm"    Regarding the medals, Rodrigo Guerrero, Mayor of Cali, stated that "This mistake in no way undermines the value of the medals, and the spirit of the games. People are making a tempest in a tea cup out of this situation."

Medal results

Official sports

Key:
Medal tally of the 2013 World Games' Official Results website, which includes road speed skating. In one aerobic gymnastics event there was a four-way tie for first place; four gold medals and no silver or bronze medals were awarded.  In another aerobic gymnastics event there was a tie for second-place; two silver medals and no bronze medal were awarded. In two trampoline/tumbing gymnastics events, there was tie for first-place; in each event, two gold medals and no silver medal were awarded.

Invitational sports
Key:
As of August 3, 2013, from the Games' official Invitational Sports Medal Tally.

Broadcasters

Host broadcaster
  Señal Colombia

International Broadcasters
  TV Esporte Interativo and ESPN Brasil
  VTV
  NHK
  Fox Sports (Australia)
  ESPN
  Czech Television
  CCTV
           STAR Sports Fox Sports Plus HD

References

External links
Official website
World Games 2013 - Olympicsuniverse.com
International World Games Association
Results book

 
World Games
World Games
International sports competitions hosted by Colombia
2013
Sport in Cali
Multi-sport events in Colombia
Articles containing video clips
July 2013 sports events in South America
August 2013 sports events in South America